Indonesia and Sweden established diplomatic relations in 1960. In recent years both nations demonstrate growing keenness to improve bilateral relations, as each head of government exchanged visits. Indonesia has an embassy in Stockholm that also accredited to Latvia, while Sweden has an embassy in Jakarta that also accredited to East Timor.

History
After the Indonesian Revolution, Sweden recognized the new state of Indonesia in 1949. The diplomatic relations between Indonesia and Sweden was established in 1950, followed by the establishment of embassies in each counterparts capitals'. The first Indonesian President Sukarno visited Sweden on May 3–5, 1959. The Swedish embassy in Jakarta is also accredited to Timor Leste that opened diplomatic relations with Sweden since 2002.

For most of the 1980s and 1990s the bilateral relations was rather strained, because there was numbers of the separatist Free Aceh Movement (GAM) leaders resided in Sweden, and made Stockholm as their foreign base to gain international support and recognition. During the aftermath of Aceh Tsunami, Sweden is among international helps that promptly provided aid to devastated areas in Indonesia. In the next year, Indonesian Government and GAM leaders has reconciled their differences through peace negotiations in 2005, the conflict in Aceh has ended. Sweden also has actively contributed in Aceh peace process and gave assistance to the tsunami reconstruction.

High level visits

In 2008, Swedish Foreign Minister Carl Bildt visited Jakarta. In early 2012, King Carl XVI Gustaf of Sweden visited Indonesia, it was the first ever by a Swedish monarch. In November 2012, Prime Minister Fredrik Reinfeldt followed suit, also the first ever visit by a Swedish head of government. The courtesy call reciprocated with Indonesian President Susilo Bambang Yudhoyono visits to Sweden on 27–29 May 2013.

Agreements
The two countries have signed Memorandum of Understanding to strengthened  bilateral cooperation on sustainable urban development, science, innovation and research, healthcare and environment.  Indonesia is also keen to learn more from Swedish experience in maintaining its environment, such as developing renewable energy sources.

Trade and investment
Sweden is one of Indonesia's most important trade partner in Europe, and its bilateral trade with Indonesia is the highest among Scandinavian countries. The trade volume between Indonesia-Sweden has reached US$1.05 billion in 2011 and grow to US$1.46 billion in 2012. In 2011 Swedish investment in Indonesia was stood around US$916,000 in 9 projects, in 2012 the figures rose to US$5.2 million in 11 projects. In 2021, Ambassador of Indonesia to Sweden introduced the Indonesian Investment Authority (INA), the first sovereign investment fund in Indonesia, responsible for supporting significant infrastructure projects in Indonesia. INA could be an opportunity to develop stronger economic cooperation with the support of many Swedish companies operating in the infrastructure and telecommunications sectors of Indonesia. The two countries also have been in favor of the ASEAN-EU relationship, which has escalated into a Strategic Partnership in December 2020. Sweden further provides support for the progress of the Indonesia-EU CEPA negotiations.

See also 
Foreign relations of Indonesia
Foreign relations of Sweden
Indonesia–European Union relations

Notes

External links
Embassy of the Republic of Indonesia in Stockholm, Sweden
Embassy of Sweden in Jakarta, Indonesia

 
Sweden
Bilateral relations of Sweden